Il Monello della strada is a 1951 Italian  comedy film directed by Carlo Borghesio.

Cast
 Erminio Macario: Carletto Po
 Ciccio Jacono: Paolino
 Luisa Rossi: Anna Galeazzi
 Saro Urzì: il commissario
 Franco Balducci: Arizona Bill
 Vittorina Benvenuti: Adele
 Pietro Tordi: Zeno  
 Carlo Rizzo: Bastiano

External links
 
 

1951 films
Films scored by Nino Rota
1950s Italian-language films
Films directed by Carlo Borghesio
Italian comedy films
1951 comedy films
Italian black-and-white films
1950s Italian films